Anatrachyntis anoista is a moth in the family Cosmopterigidae. It was described by John David Bradley in 1956 and is known from Lord Howe Island.

References 

Anatrachyntis
Moths described in 1956
Moths of Australia